Ectocarpaceae is a family of brown algae in the order Ectocarpales. It includes four genera, Ectocarpus, Kuckuckia, Pleurocladia, and Spongostema.

References

Ectocarpales
Brown algae families
Taxa named by Jacob Georg Agardh